The Palais du Mobilier Bonn Frères (in English: Bonn Frères Furniture Showroom) is an Art Deco-style building in the city of Luxembourg (Luxembourg) designed by the architect Léon Bouvart (1883–1933) and built in 1925–26 by the contractor Achille Giorgetti for the Bonn family.

History
Stanislas Bonn (1833–1888) was a furniture merchant who quickly adapted to the industrialized methods of production during the mid-19th century, and opened a furniture store in Luxembourg in 1855. Originally, his business was located in the suburbs, but he soon relocated to larger, more centrally located premises on the Philippsgasse (also called the Rue Philippe II). The furniture business expanded to eventually occupy the entire building and was eventually named "Bonn Frères" (Brothers), which was retained as the official name until 1994. 

Ownership passed eventually to Mirtyl Bonn (1869–1956). Mirtyl Bonn's daughter Gabrielle married Paul Lazard in 1928, and the building passed to the estate of the Lazard family. The Nazis seized the building during World War II, but the Lazard family reclaimed possession of the business and building afterwards.

Building
The building has seven storeys and is the largest furniture store in Luxembourg. It was first renovated in 1967 and then again from 1990-94 to plans of the architectural firm "Architecture et Environnement" together with the architects Gilbert Huybrechts and Jean Herr. In the latter renovation the original structure was integrated with the houses neighboring it to both the left and right; a section called Carré Bonn housing offices was created on the upper floors, while the lower 3 levels are reserved for the furniture and decor business showroom.

References

Further reading

 Christian Aschman, Joanna Grodecki, Robert L. Philippart, 2013. Lëtzebuerg moderne: Liebeserklärung an die Hauptstadt. Édition Maison Moderne, S. 56. .

1926 establishments in Luxembourg
Commercial buildings completed in 1926
Palaces in Luxembourg City
Art Deco architecture
Furniture companies